Football is the most popular sport in North Macedonia. The country became a member of FIFA in 1994.

The national team has made a few remarkable results in qualifiers for the European Championship as well as the World Cup. The most sensational result was probably the 2–2 draw away against England (October 2002). Two years later the Netherlands were held to a 2–2 draw at home (October 2004). The away-game the following year in Amsterdam also ended with a draw (0–0). On October 7, 2006, once again England was held to a draw in Manchester. On November 17, 2007, North Macedonia beat the group winners, Croatia, 2–0.

Format
The governing body of football in North Macedonia is the Football Federation of North Macedonia. It oversees the organization of:

 Leagues:
 Macedonian First Football League
 Macedonian Second Football League
 Macedonian Third Football League
 Macedonian Regional Leagues
 Cup tournaments:
 Macedonian Football Cup
 Macedonian Football Super Cup
 National teams:
 North Macedonia national football team
 North Macedonia national under-21 football team
 North Macedonia national under-19 football team
 North Macedonia national under-17 football team
 North Macedonia women's national football team

Note: the aforementioned competitions are for men if not stated differently. Women's football exists but is much less developed or popular.

Teams

By far the most popular clubs in the country are Akademija Pandev (Strumica), Vardar (Skopje), Rabotnichki (Skopje), Shkëndija (Tetovo), Pelister (Bitola) and Pobeda (Prilep).

History
The beginnings of football in North Macedonia date back to the early 20th century in the then Ottoman Empire, with the first recorded match taking place in Skopje in April 1909. At that place was erected a monument in the form of soccer ball weighing about 250 pounds, because it was the first official soccer match played on the territory of North Macedonia. The monument was erected here in 1979. 

After the First World War, the region had become part of the Kingdom of Serbs, Croats and Slovenes (renamed to Yugoslavia in 1929). A match was played in Skopje on April 20, 1919. It was the selection of the English army composed of the best players among the recruits, against Napredok of Skopje, Napredok would win the match by the score of 2-0. Since 1920, the clubs from the current territory of the Republic of North Macedonia had competed in the Yugoslav league system. First they were part of the Belgrade Football Subassociation (1920–1927), and later, in 1927, a separate Skoplje Football Subassociation was formed.  The creation of the later made it considerably easier for Macedonian clubs to access Yugoslav First League since the Subassocion leagues functioned as qualifying leagues for the Yugoslav national championship and they avoided the clubs from Belgrade. Gragjanski Skopje became usual participant during the late 1930s in the Yugoslav top tier.  By the late 1930s and early 1940s the league system was changed, and Macedonian clubs competed within the Serbian league.

In 1941, as a result of the Second World War, most of Vardar Macedonia was administered by the Kingdom of Bulgaria. The football clubs and leagues were restructured and incorporated into the Bulgarian league system. From 1941 until 1944, the strongest clubs from the region competed in the Bulgarian Championship. During that time, the selection of Macedonian clubs played against the selection of the German army, and played matches against Bulgaria. During this period, several players from Vardar Macedonia represented the Bulgarian national football team.

In 1945, at the end of the Second World War, the region was reincorporated into Yugoslavia, and SR Macedonia was established as one of the 6 constituent socialist republics of SFR Yugoslavia.  The best Macedonian clubs usually competed in the Federal leagues, First and Second Yugoslav leagues, while the Macedonian Republic League was formed to serve as qualifying league for the federal ones.  In 1945, after the Second World War, a section of the Association of Sports in Skopje with Gustav Vlahov as president, was created. Finally on 14 August 1949, the Macedonian Football Association was formed and was part of the Football Association of Yugoslavia until 1991, when North Macedonia declared independence. The first president of the Football Federation of Macedonia was Ljubisav Ivanov - Dzingo. The best Macedonian players were part of the Yugoslav national team.

In 1991, North Macedonia became an independent sovereign nation as the Republic of Macedonia which would change to the Republic of North Macedonia in 2019. Macedonian clubs abandoned the Yugoslav football league system and created their own league system.  The first championship in North Macedonia was organized in the season 1992/93, in which 18 teams participated. Vardar from Skopje was the first champion without a lost match. They would also win the first ever Macedonian Cup. In 1994, North Macedonia became a member of FIFA and UEFA after the break-up of SFR Yugoslavia. In 1995, for the first time Macedonian clubs participated in European Cup matches. As champions, FK Vardar played in the UEFA Cup against Hungarian side Békéscsaba and lost 1–2 on aggregate. FK Sileks played in the UEFA Cup Winners' Cup, eliminating Vác Samsung in the first qualifying round before losing to Borussia Mönchengladbach in the next round.

The national team began its football journey with a 4–1 win against Slovenia in a friendly on 13 October 1993 under coach Andon Dončevski. They went on to win their next two friendlies against Slovenia and Estonia before suffering their first loss against Turkey on 31 August 1994 (before this they lost to Club Atlético Peñarol 0–4 in Montevideo in February 1994). The inaugural North Macedonia side featured Darko Pančev, who won the European Champions League with Red Star Belgrade in 1991 and also played for Internazionale in Italy. The Euro 96 Qualifiers was the first major qualifying tournament that North Macedonia participated in as an independent nation and they were grouped with Spain, Denmark, Belgium, Cyprus, and Armenia. In their opening game, which was also their first ever official match, North Macedonia was drawn against the reigning European Champions Denmark. The game was played at the City Stadium in Skopje on 7 September 1994 and it finished 1–1 (the first goal was scored by Mitko Stojkovski) with North Macedonia leading for most of the game after scoring in the fourth minute. Since then, North Macedonia has been participating in all FIFA and UEFA sanctioned qualifying tournaments.

In 2016, the national U-21 team qualified for the final tournament of 2017 UEFA European Under-21 Championship after finishing first in qualification group 3 behind France, Iceland, Ukraine, Scotland and Northern Ireland. That was the first time that the any national football team of North Macedonia qualified for a major tournament. In 2017, North Macedonia's capital Skopje were host the 2017 UEFA Super Cup between Real Madrid and Manchester United. Also, in that year, Vardar advanced to the group stage of the UEFA Europa League, after winning over two matches against Turkish giants Fenerbahçe in the play-off round, marking the first time that any Macedonian club qualified for the group stage of any European competition.

League system

References

External links
Macedonian Football 
Football Federation of Macedonia 

 

lt:Makedonijos futbolo sistema